Bad Dürkheim station is a terminal station in Bad Dürkheim in the German state of Rhineland-Palatinate. It is on the Palatinate Northern Railway between Neustadt an der Weinstraße and Monsheim. It is classified by Deutsche Bahn as a category 5 station.

Entrance building

The entrance building is a heritage-listed building.

In front of the entrance building is the terminus of the Bad Dürkheim–Ludwigshafen-Oggersheim railway. Bad Dürkheim also includes the stations of Bad Dürkheim-Trift and Bad Dürkheim Ost.

History

The station was opened on 6 May 1865 as part of the Neustadt–Bad Durkheim line. The station was not relocated with the closing of the Grünstadt–Bad Durkheim gap on 20 July 1873, so the station remains as a terminal station, even though it is in the middle on the line.

In 1913, the Bad Durkheim–Ludwigshafen-Oggersheim railway was opened by Rhein-Haardt Bahn GmbH, which begins on the station forecourt. Between Ludwigshafen-Oggersheim and Bad Durkheim, the line, which was authorised as a railway, runs in Bad Dürkheim as a tram on grooved rails.

Operations

Bad Durkheim station has three platform tracks, which are used only by regional trains. Regional services connect the station with Neustadt an der Weinstraße at 30-minute intervals. An excursion train runs under the name of the Elsass-Express (Alsace-Express) between Mainz via Bad Durkheim to Wissembourg on weekends and public holidays during the summer. The terminal loop of the Bad Durkheim–Ludwigshafen-Oggersheim railway is located outside the station. This route is served by line 4 of the Mannheim/Ludwigshafen tramways.

Notes

Railway stations in Rhineland-Palatinate
Railway stations in Germany opened in 1870